The Internet Hall of Fame is an honorary lifetime achievement award administered by the Internet Society (ISOC) in recognition of individuals who have made significant contributions to the development and advancement of the Internet.

Overview 
The Internet Hall of Fame was established in 2012, on the 20th anniversary of ISOC. Its stated purpose is to "publicly recognize a distinguished and select group of visionaries, leaders and luminaries who have made significant contributions to the development and advancement of the global Internet".

Nominations may be made by anyone through an applications process. The Internet Hall of Fame Advisory Board is responsible for the final selection of inductees. The advisory board is made up of professionals in the Internet industry.

History 
In 2012, there were 33 inaugural inductees into the Hall of Fame, announced on April 23, 2012, at the Internet Society's Global INET conference in Geneva, Switzerland.

There were 32 inductees in 2013. They were announced on June 26, 2013, and the induction ceremony was held on August 3, 2013, in Berlin, Germany. The ceremony was originally to be held in Istanbul, but the venue was changed due to the ongoing government protests in Turkey.

The class of 2014 inducted 24 people. They were announced at an event in Hong Kong.

There were no inductees in 2015 or 2016, while the ISOC worked to create an Advisory Board to provide leadership on the program's direction. This Advisory Board would be responsible for the selection of the inductees going forward.

On September 18, 2017, the Internet Society gathered to honor the fourth class of Internet Hall of Fame Inductees at UCLA, where nearly 50 years ago, the first electronic message was sent over the Internet's predecessor, the ARPANET.

On September 27, 2019, 11 new members were inducted into the Internet Hall of Fame in a ceremony in San Jose, Costa Rica. The inductees included Larry Irving, the first African-American to be inducted.

In February 2021, the Internet Hall of Fame announced that nominations were open for 2021 inductees until April 23, 2021, which was later extended to May 7, 2021.

Inductees 
From 2012 to 2017, inductees were considered in three categories:
 Pioneers: "Individuals who were instrumental in the early design and development of the Internet."
 Global Connectors:  "Individuals from around the world who have made significant contributions to the global growth and use of the Internet."
 Innovators: "Individuals who made outstanding technological, commercial, or policy advances and helped to expand the Internet's reach."
An asterisk (*) indicates a posthumous recipient. In 2019, inductees were not assigned categories.

Pioneers 

2012
  Paul Baran*
  Vint Cerf
  Danny Cohen
  Steve Crocker
  Donald Davies*
  Elizabeth J. Feinler
  Charles Herzfeld*
  Robert Kahn
  Peter Kirstein*
  Leonard Kleinrock
  John Klensin
  Jon Postel*
  Louis Pouzin
  Lawrence Roberts

2013
  David Clark
  David Farber
  Howard Frank*
  Kanchana Kanchanasut
  J.C.R. Licklider*
  Bob Metcalfe
  Jun Murai
  Kees Neggers
  Nii Quaynor
  Glenn Ricart
  Robert Taylor
  Stephen Wolff
  Werner Zorn

2014
  Douglas Engelbart*
  Susan Estrada
  Frank Heart*
  Dennis Jennings
  Rolf Nordhagen*
  Radia Perlman

Global connectors 

2012
  Randy Bush
  Kilnam Chon
  Al Gore
  Nancy Hafkin
  Geoff Huston
  Brewster Kahle
  Daniel Karrenberg
  Toru Takahashi
  Tan Tin Wee

2013
  Karen Banks
  Gihan Dias
  Anriette Esterhuysen
  Steve Goldstein
  Teus Hagen
  Ida Holz
  Qiheng Hu
  Haruhisa Ishida*
  Barry Leiner*
  George Sadowsky

2014
  Dai Davies
  Demi Getschko
  Masaki Hirabaru*
  Erik Huizer
  Steve Huter
  Abhaya Induruwa
  Dorcas Muthoni
  Mahabir Pun
  Srinivasan Ramani
  Michael Roberts
  Ben Segal
  Douglas Van Houweling

2017
  Nabil Bukhalid
  Ira Fuchs
  Shigeki Goto
  Mike Jensen
  Ermanno Pietrosemoli
  Tadao Takahashi
  Florencio Utreras
  Jianping Wu

Innovators 

2012
  Mitchell Baker
  Tim Berners-Lee
  Robert Cailliau
  Van Jacobson
  Lawrence Landweber
  Paul Mockapetris
  Craig Newmark
  Raymond Tomlinson
  Linus Torvalds
  Philip Zimmermann

2013
  Marc Andreessen
  John Perry Barlow*
  François Flückiger
  Stephen Kent
  Anne-Marie Eklund Löwinder
  Henning Schulzrinne
  Richard Stallman
  Aaron Swartz*
  Jimmy Wales

2014
  Eric Allman
  Eric Bina
  Karlheinz Brandenburg
  John Cioffi
  Hualin Qian
  Paul Vixie

2017
  Jaap Akkerhuis
  Yvonne Marie Andrés
  Alan Emtage
  Ed Krol
  Tracy LaQuey Parker
  Craig Partridge

Inductees since 2019 

2019
  Adiel Akplogan
  Kimberly Claffy
  Douglas Comer
  Elise Gerich
  Larry Irving
  Dan Lynch
  Jean Armour Polly
  José Soriano
  Michael Stanton
  Klaas Wierenga
  Suguru Yamaguchi*

2021
  Carlos Afonso
  Rob Blokzijl*
  Hans-Werner Braun
  Frode Greisen
  Jan Gruntorad
  Saul Hahn
  Kim Hubbard
  Rafael (Lito) Ibarra
  Xing Li
  Yngvar G. Lundh*
  Dan Kaminsky*
  DaeYoung Kim
  Kenneth J. Klingenstein
  Alejandro Pisanty
  Yakov Rekhter
  Philip Smith
  Pål Spilling*
  Liane Tarouco
  Virginia Travers
  George Varghese
  Lixia Zhang

Advisory board 

2012
 Lishan Adam
 Joi Ito
 Mark Mahaney
 Chris Anderson
 Mike Jensen
 Alejandro Pisanty
 Alex Corenthin
 Aleks Krotoski
 Lee Rainie
 William H. Dutton
 Loïc Le Meur

2013 and 2014
 Lishan Adam
 Raúl Echeberría
 C.L. Liu
 Hessa Al Jaber
 Hartmut Glaser
 Alejandro Pisanty
 Grace Chng
 Katie Hafner
 Oliver Popov
 Alex Corenthin
 Mike Jensen
 Lee Rainie
 William H. Dutton
 Aleks Krotoski
 Andreu Veà Baró

2017
 Randy Bush
 Steven Huter
 Srinivasan Ramani
 Kilnam Chon
 Abhaya Induruwa
 Glenn Ricart
 Gihan Dias
 Dennis Jennings
 Lawrence Roberts
 Anriette Esterhuysen
 John Klensin
 George Sadowsky
 Susan Estrada
 Lawrence Landweber
 Douglas Van Houweling
 Demi Getschko
 Paul Mockapetris
 Paul Vixie
 Nancy Hafkin
 Radia Perlman

See also 

 Internet celebrity
 Internet pioneers
 IEEE Internet Award

References

External links 
 
 Q&As with the living inductees, from Wired, 2012

Lifetime achievement awards
Awards established in 2012
Science and technology halls of fame